Zalgo text, also known as cursed text due to the nature of its use, is digital text that has been modified with numerous combining characters, Unicode symbols used to add diacritics above or below letters, to appear frightening or glitchy.

Named for a 2004 Internet creepypasta story that ascribes it to the influence of an eldritch deity, Zalgo text has become a significant component of many Internet memes, particularly in the "surreal meme" culture. The formatting of Zalgo text also allows it to be used to halt or impair certain computer functions, whether intentionally or not.

History
Zalgo text was pioneered in 2004 by a Something Awful forum member who created image macros of glitched or distorted cartoon characters exclaiming "Zalgo!" The text in the images was often distorted, and the style of the distortion became popularised as "Zalgo text". The characters were often depicted bleeding from their eyes, and forum members interpreted Zalgo as an unimaginable, eldritch apocalyptic figure.

Usage

Zalgo text is generated by excessively adding various diacritical marks in the form of Unicode combining characters to the letters in a string of digital text. Historically, it has primarily been used in horror or creepypasta Internet memes. Its seemingly improperly rendered or glitched-out characters make it prevalent amongst memes intended to make the reader's device appear to be malfunctioning. Zalgo text has become popular in the world of "surreal memes", which are intended to come across as bizarre or absurd. A common signifier of surreal memes, Zalgo text ties in with an overall aesthetic sensibility of the strange and impossible that includes elements such as clip art and strange-looking recurring characters but refuses to represent real-world elements such as real people or brands.

Zalgo text has also been used or alluded to outside of Internet memes. A fan-made campaign logo for the Michael Bloomberg 2020 presidential campaign, originally mistaken for an official logo, was described as closely resembling Zalgo text. In 2020, a teenager and TikTok creator submitted the word "hamburger" in Zalgo text for his school yearbook caption; when the yearbook was printed, the text overlapped his photograph and that of the student below him.

In addition to legitimate uses, Zalgo text has been used maliciously to crash or overwhelm messaging apps. Some versions of the Apple Messages app are unable to properly handle Zalgo text, and will crash if they try to render a message that contains such text. This behavior has been used to perform denial-of-service attacks against iOS users. Similarly, Zalgo messages sent over Gmail have caused crashes.

Influence
Zalgo text has led to the creation of other Internet-based glitch art. Performance artist Laimonas Zakas was inspired by Zalgo text to create Glitchr, a Facebook page that intentionally modifies and glitches Facebook code.

Though the most influential aspect of the original Zalgo creepypasta is the modified text characters, other aspects of the story have been popular as well. Fans of the story have conceptualized Zalgo as "either an unseen supernatural force, a secret cabal, or perhaps even an evil demigod" and compared it to the Great Old Ones in the work of H. P. Lovecraft. Fan art depictions of Zalgo have included drawings and short films.

See also
Universal Character Set characters
Glitch art
List of creepypastas

References

Internet memes
Internet memes introduced in 2004
Software bugs
Unicode
Creepypasta
Diacritics